Villamayor is a municipality located in the province of Salamanca, Castile and León, Spain. According to the 2016 census (INE), the municipality has a population of 7,047 inhabitants.

Buildings and headquarters
Villamayor is the headquarters of the Spanish Society of Academic Excellence.

References

Municipalities in the Province of Salamanca